Many sports are played by the people of Tamil Nadu including both traditional sports and sports from other countries.

Traditional Sports

Silambattam

Silambam is a weapon-based Indian martial art originating in South India in the Indian subcontinent which is being played as a traditional sport even in this modern days. This style is mentioned in Tamil Sangam literature [1] The World Silambam Association is the official international body of Silambam.   It is the most important traditional sport of Tamil nadu which is involved with the lives of people since sangam age.  It is a sport as well as self defending and attacking techniques.  It is the most oldest form of martial art originated from South India

Kabaddi

Kabaddi is the state sport of Tamil Nadu. The word "kabadi" is derived from the Tamil word "kai-pudi"(கைபிடி) meaning "to hold hands". It is also known as sadu-gudu.

Kabaddi – the State Sport of Tamil Nadu
Of the many sports played in the Indian state of Tamil Nadu, both traditional as well as foreign sports, kabaddi takes the honor for being the state sport. It’s derived from the Tamil word ‘kai-pudi’, meaning ‘to hold hands’. Kabaddi is an ancient contact sport which’s origins can be traced back to about 4000 years ago in India during the Mahabharata period. Buddhist literatures also have citing of Lord Buddha playing kabaddi as a recreational sport.  Kabadi is played as a mock up practise prior to the traditional sport Jallikattu later it is spread over as a commercial sport.

It’s known by different names in different places such as ‘bhavatik’ in Maldives, ‘kauddi’ in Punjab and ‘hadudu’ in Bengal. At this point it’s important to note that some other states like Punjab, Andhra Pradesh and Telangana also recognize kabaddi as their state sport.

The essence of this game is for the defending team to hold onto the raiding team in their pitch. Though there are slight variations in the game played in different places, the basic rules are the same. India introduced this sport on a world platform during the 1936 Olympics in Berlin. It was popularized in Japan in 1979, Bangladesh in 1973 and Iran in 1996. It is the National Sport of Bangladesh and one of the national sports of Nepal.

This game is often called the ‘game of the masses’ as it holds a lot of public appeal due to its simplicity and games are watched with a great deal of gusto and raucous cheering. So far, India has been indomitable at all the international kabaddi tournaments and with seven World Cup titles and numerous Asian Games gold medals, the Indian men’s team is at the pinnacle of success.

In Tamil Nadu, kabaddi is more than just a game; it’s a sport that’s ingrained into the minds right from childhood when all that’s required is an open ground, a few friends and the enthusiasm for the game, muttering ‘kabaddi, kabaddi’ as they maneuver through the opponents team. Stamina and agility are two key strengths that are needed for this game and Tamil Nadu has done the country proud by producing many players who have been part of the winning national team.

Seval Sandai

Seval Sandai or Seval Porr (cockfighting) is a popular rural sport in Tamil Nadu. Three or four-inch blades are attached to the cocks' feet and the winner is decided after three or four rounds of no holds barred fighting. The sport involves major gambling in recent times. Cockfighting in Tamil Nadu is mentioned in ancient literature like Manu Needhi Sastiram, Kattu Seval Sastiram and other Sangam literature. It is referred to as the favorite pastime for the warriors of Tamil country and is acknowledged as one amongst the 64 great arts.

It involves basically fighting skills for your chicken.Now it is widely played in the places of North America and Asia

Jallikattu

Jallikattu is a popular bull taming sport practiced particularly during Pongal festival. Jallikattu was a popular sport since the Sangam period and Tamil classical period. Jallikattu (or sallikkattu), also known as eru thazhuvuthal and manju virattu, is a traditional spectacle in which a bull, such as the Pulikulam or Kangayam breeds, is released into a crowd of people, and multiple human participants attempt to grab the large hump on the bull's back with both arms and hang on to it while the bull attempts to escape. Participants hold the hump for as long as possible, attempting to bring the bull to a stop. In some cases, participants must ride long enough to remove flags on the bull's horns].

Rekla 

Rekla is a sport which is a form of bullock cart racing.

Sathurangam 
Chess is believed to have originated in India, c. 280 – 550 CE, where its early form in Tamil Nadu was known as Sathurangam literally four divisions [of the military] – infantry, cavalry, elephants, and chariotry, represented by the pieces that would evolve into the modern pawn, knight, bishop, and rook, respectively.

Modern day chess is a widely popular game in the state and Tamil Nadu State Chess Association is the apex body for the game of chess in Tamil Nadu. The state has produced many grandmasters including Viswanathan Anand, one of the greatest and most versatile players of the modern era having won the World Chess Championship five times from 2002 to 2013. Other notable players include S. Vijayalakshmi, P. V. Nandhidhaa and Krishnan Sasikiran.

Malyutham

Malyutham is a traditional Indian art of full contact Grappling that originated in Tamil Nadu. It was widely practiced in Tamil Nadu since ancient times as a sport. Malyutham is one of the 64 Arts mentioned in Ancient Literature. Malyutham is one of the Traditional Sports practiced in Tamil Nadu. There is another Art named Malla - Yuddha coming from North India. Although the names are similar, Malla-Yuddha and Malyutham are two different and very distinct Arts. They are different in the nature of the techniques studied and on their external aspects as well.

Gusthi
Gusthi is a Traditional Sports Activity, which is practiced in punjab since time immemorial. Gusthi is also known as Kai Kuthu Sandai. Gusthi is a form of Traditional Boxing, which is slightly deviated from Wrestling. Gusthi of Tamil Nadu is a derivative of Malyutham of Tamil Nadu. Gusthi also includes Grapplings as well. There is another art coming from North India named Kushti. Although the names are almost same, Gusthi and Kushti are two different and two distinct arts. Gusthi is an art of Boxing, while Kusthi is an art of Wrestling. They are different in the nature of the techniques studied and on their external aspects as well.

Killithattu
A game that requires quick reflexes, tactical thinking and tremendous team effort. This sport is a part of Tamil heritage and preserves  Tamil identity. The ‘kili’ or last player must stand on the centre of the first lane when the game starts.
The ‘kili’ player can move anywhere around the court or through the middle of the court but not horizontally. The team that is guarding the base and capturing it is chosen by a coin toss. The game is started by a whistle sound by the overseeing referee. When the game starts, each of the other members can only move sideways/horizontally. This accounts for the rest of the 5 members of the team for a total of 6 including ‘kili’.

Kho-kho
Kho kho is a tag sport played by teams of twelve players who try to avoid being touched by members of the opposing team, only 9 players of the team enter the field. It is one of the two most popular traditional tag games played in schools, the other being kabbadi.

Uriyadi
Uriyadi involves smashing a small earthen pot with a long stick usually with a cloth wrapped around the eyes to prevent the participants from seeing the pot. Other minor sports include Ilavatta kal where lift huge spherical rocks, Gilli-danda played with two pieces of sticks, Nondi played by folding one leg and hopping squares. Some of the indoor games include Pallanguzhi involving beads, Bambaram involving spinning of top, Dhayakattai which is a modified dice game, Aadu puli attam, Nungu vandi and Seechangal.

Seven-Stones
Seven stones It is a traditional game in India as well as in Tamilnadu. It is an ancient game which is also called as Lagori. It has things similar to dodge ball but it has extra features than the dodge ball. They use seven stones that can be piled on top of each other and has a minimum of 2-6 player in a team.

Modern sports

Cricket

Cricket is the most popular sport. It is played by many people in open spaces throughout the state. Tamil Nadu Cricket Association is the governing body of cricket activities in the Tamil Nadu state of India and the Tamil Nadu cricket team, which has won the Ranji Trophy twice and have finished Runners-up 9 times. Chennai Super Kings, a franchise based out of Chennai is the most successful team in the Indian Premier League. Notable international cricketers from Tamil Nadu include Srinivas Venkataraghavan, Kris Srikkanth, Laxman Sivaramakrishnan, Robin Singh, Murali Vijay, Ravichandran Ashwin, Dinesh Karthik, Sadagoppan Ramesh, Vijay Shankar, Washington Sundar, T._Natarajan, Murali Karthik, Subramaniam Badrinath and Lakshmipathy Balaji. Cricket administrators from the state include current International Cricket Council president N. Srinivasan, former BCCI presidents A. C. Muthiah and his father M. A. Chidambaram.

M. A. Chidambaram Stadium in Chennai is one of the oldest cricketing venues and was the host of India's first test cricket victory. MRF Pace Foundation, a coaching clinic for training fast bowlers from all over the world is based in Chennai. It was created by MRF Limited with the help of former Australian pace spearhead Dennis Lillee.

Hockey
Hockey is one of the popular sports played in schools and colleges. Mayor Radhakrishnan Stadium is a field hockey stadium at Chennai named after M. Radhakrishna Pillai and was the venue to the 1996 Men's Champions Trophy and tournament tournaments. It is also the venue for all division matches of the Chennai Hockey Association and the home ground of the World Series Hockey team Chennai Cheetahs. Sports Development Authority of Tamil Nadu is planning to set up a hockey academy Notable international players include Vasudevan Baskaran, Krishnamurthy Perumal, M. J. Gopalan, Dhanraj Pillay, Adam Sinclair and Mohammed Riaz.

Tennis
Chennai Open was an ATP World Tour 250 series tournament previously held annually in January at SDAT Tennis Stadium in Chennai. It was the only ATP tournament held in the country until 2017, after which the tournament moved to Pune. Notable players are Ramesh Krishnan, Ramanathan Krishnan, Vijay Amritraj, Mahesh Bhupathi, Ramkumar Ramanathan, Prajnesh Gunneswaran, and Nirupama Vaidyanathan.

Motor racing

Coimbatore is often referred to as the "Motor sports Capital of India" and the "Backyard of Indian Motorsports". S.Karivardhan, spearheaded motor racing, making Coimbatore the country's motor racing hub when he designed and built entry level race cars. Before Buddh International Circuit was constructed, the country's only two permanent race ways were the Kari Motor Speedway, Coimbatore and Madras Motor Racing Track, Chennai. MRF built is first Formula 3 car in 1997. MRF in collaboration with Maruti established the Formula Maruti racing, a single-seater, open wheel class motorsport racing event for race cars made in India. MRF Challenge is a Formula 2000 open-wheel motorsport formula based series organized by Madras Motor Sports Club in association with MRF. Narain Karthikeyan and Karun Chandhok, the only drivers from to represent India in Formula 1 hail from the state. Other prominent racers include Parthiva Sureshwaren, Ashwin Sundar, N. Leelakrishnan, Raj Bharath and Ajith Kumar represented India.

Others
Other popular games include athletics, soccer, basketball, volleyball, softball and badminton. Jawaharlal Nehru Stadium, Chennai and Nehru Stadium, Coimbatore are popular multipurpose football and athletics stadiums in the state. Notable volleyball players include A. Palaniswamy, G. E. Sridharan and Tamil Nadu men's team won the Gold in National level competition held in 2011. Joshna Chinappa and Dipika Pallikal are the notable squash players who won gold at the Commonwealth games. Kutraleeswaran is a notable swimmer, who was the first Indian to cross six channels in a single calendar year. Archery, boxing, carrom, shooting, weightlifting, martial arts, snooker, golf, bowling, and squash also feature among sports played. Srither won gold at Asian Archery Championship held at Indonesia in November 2009. A. Maria Irudayam and Ilavzhagi won world carrom championships. 
Santhi Soundarajan is the first Tamil woman to win a medal at Asian Games. Sathish Sivalingam is a commonwealth gold medalist in weightlifting. Mariyappan Thangavelu has won the gold medal in the finals of 2016 Summer Paralympic games held in Rio de Janeiro.

See also
 Tamil Nadu Cricket Association
 List of Tamil recipients of the Arjuna Award
 List of sportspeople from Tamil Nadu
 Sport in India
 Sport in Chennai
 Indian martial arts

References

External links
 Sports Development Authority of Tamil Nadu
 Tamil Nadu archery association
 Tamil Nadu Billiards and Snooker Association
  Tamil Nadu State Aquatic Association

Sport in Tamil Nadu